Svetlana Katok (born May 1, 1947) is a Russian-American mathematician and a professor of mathematics at Pennsylvania State University.

Education and career
Katok grew up in Moscow, and earned a master's degree from Moscow State University in 1969; however, due to the anti-Semitic and anti-intelligentsia policies of the time, she was denied admission to the doctoral program there and instead worked for several years in the area of early and secondary mathematical education. She immigrated to the US in 1978,
and earned her doctorate from the University of Maryland, College Park in 1983 under the supervision of Don Zagier. She joined the Pennsylvania State University faculty in 1990.

Katok founded the Electronic Research Announcements of the American Mathematical Society in 1995; it was renamed in 2007 to the Electronic Research Announcements in Mathematical Sciences, and she remains its managing editor.

Books
Katok is the author of:
Fuchsian Groups, Chicago Lectures in Mathematics, University of Chicago Press, 1992. Russian edition, Faktorial Press, Moscow, 2002.
p-adic Analysis Compared with Real, Student Mathematical Library, vol. 37, American Math. Soc., 2007. Russian edition, MCCME Press, Moscow, 2004.
Additionally, she coedited the book MASS Selecta: Teaching and learning advanced undergraduate mathematics (American Math. Soc., 2003).

Awards and honors
Katok was the 2004 Emmy Noether Lecturer of the Association for Women in Mathematics. In 2012 she and her husband, mathematician Anatole Katok, both became fellows of the American Mathematical Society.

References

1947 births
Living people
20th-century American mathematicians
21st-century American mathematicians
Russian mathematicians
American women mathematicians
Moscow State University alumni
University of Maryland, College Park alumni
Pennsylvania State University faculty
Fellows of the American Mathematical Society
20th-century women mathematicians
21st-century women mathematicians
20th-century American women
21st-century American women